Qosabeh District is in Meshgin Shahr County, Ardabil province, Iran. At the 2006 and 2011 censuses, the constituent parts of the district (Meshgin-e Gharbi Rural District, Shaban Rural District, and the village of Qosabeh) were within the Central District of the county. At the latest census in 2016, the district had 9,393 inhabitants living in 2,954 households.

References 

Meshgin Shahr County

Districts of Ardabil Province

Populated places in Ardabil Province

Populated places in Meshgin Shahr County

fa:بخش قصابه